The Awetu is a river of southwestern Ethiopia found near Jimma town at 7 degrees north and 37 degrees east with some approximation. The river touches the center of the town to make its outlet southward.

References
 Profile of Jimma town (2011)

See also 
 List of rivers of Ethiopia

Rivers of Ethiopia